Plover Cove also known for its Chinese names Shuen Wan Hoi or Shuen Wan, is a cove in the Tai Po District of Hong Kong, near Tolo Channel and Tolo Harbour.

Geography
It is encircled by the hills Pat Sin Leng and Wan Leng, the Yim Tin Tsai, Ma Shi Chau and Tung Tau Chau island ranges, and a long peninsula extending from Fu Tau Sha. A major part of the cove has been dammed to form the fresh water Plover Cove Reservoir.

A land area between Sha Lan Tsuen and Ting Kok is also known as Shuen Wan.

The community of Shuen Wan Heung is made up of the eleven villages of A Shan, Tung Tsz, Wai Ha, Ha Tei Ha, Tseng Tau, San Tau Kok, Wong Yue Tan, Chim Uk, Chan Uk, Lei Uk and Sha Lan. An administrative organ for Shuen Wan Heung was established in 1992.

Historically, Ting Kok, together with the nearby Hakka villages of Shan Liu, Lai Pik Shan, Lo Tsz Tin, Lung Mei and Tai Mei Tuk belonged to the Ting Kok Yeuk alliance.

Cross Tolo Harbour Open Race
The annual Cross Tolo Harbour Open Race, an open-water swimming event organized in September/October by Tai Po Sports Association, starts at Sha Lan Tsuen near Sam Mun Tsai and finishes at Tai Mei Tuk. The course runs across Plover Cove in straight-line format and is approximately 2,600 metres in length.

See also
 Plover Cove Country Park
 Po Sam Pai
 San Tau Kok
 Wong Yue Tan
 Shuen Wan (constituency)

References

Further reading
 "Towards Urbanisation: Shuen Wan and Plover Cove Reservoir"

External links

 Image from Google Map

Bays of Hong Kong
Tai Po District
Coves